Roederer Correctional Complex is a minimum and medium-security state prison located in Buckner, Oldham County, near La Grange, Kentucky. It is about 30 miles northeast of Louisville. The Kentucky Department of Corrections Assessment and Classification Center is located at Roederer. All new male inmates, with the exception of those sentenced to death, are initially assigned to Roederer until they can be classified and transferred to other prison within the Commonwealth. The prison opened in 1978 and had a prison population of 997 as of 2007.

References
History and Overview

Buildings and structures in Oldham County, Kentucky
Prisons in Kentucky
Government buildings completed in 1978
1978 establishments in Kentucky